Praephostria flavalis is a moth in the family Crambidae. It was described by Hans Georg Amsel in 1956 and is found in Venezuela.

References

Spilomelinae
Moths described in 1956
Taxa named by Hans Georg Amsel
Moths of South America